Uí Mhaine, often Anglicised as Hy Many, was one of the oldest and largest kingdoms located in Connacht, Ireland. Its territory of approximately  encompassed all of what is now north, east and south County Galway, south and central County Roscommon, an area near County Clare, and at one stage had apparently subjugated land on the east bank of the Shannon, together with the parish of Lusmagh in Offaly.

There were two different Uí Mhaine, the Uí Mhaine of Tethbae and the Uí Mhaine of Connacht; these tribes were separated by the Shannon River.  The people of the kingdom were descendants of Maine Mór, who won the territory by warfare. Its sub-kingdoms, also known as lordships, included – among others – Soghan, Corco Mogha, Delbhna Nuadat, Síol Anmchadha, and Máenmaige. These kingdoms were made up of offshoots of the Uí Mháine dynasty, or subject peoples of different backgrounds.

The Uí Mhaine are among the ancient Irish dynasties still represented today among the recognised Irish nobility and Chiefs of the Name, by the O'Kelly of Gallagh and Tycooly, Prince of Uí Mhaine and Count of the Holy Roman Empire. The Fox (O'Kearney) may represent the eastern Uí Mhaine of Tethbae.

Early times 

Maine Mór is said to have established the kingdom around 357 AD, and ruled for fifty years.  Before his arrival, the area had been occupied by the Fir Bolg, ruled by King Cian d'Fhearaibh Bolg.

Early leaders (in order)

Main families

Descendant clans of the dynasty include the Ó Ceallaigh, Ó Draighnáin, Ó Madadháin, Ó Neachtain, Ó Cnaimhín, Ó Domhnalláin, Ó Maolalaidh,  Ó Fallamháin,  Ó Cionnaith, Ó Géibheannaigh Ó Bhreasail

Customs

An early 15th-century text Nosa Ua Maine, states that they were given rewards and treasures such as:

 A portion of all "strongholds and seaport towns in the province"
 A portion of all prizes and wrecks of the sea
 This included any wines or goods that had been washed to shore from shipwrecks, etc.
 It also included whales and fish which came to be known as "royal fish" and were given to only the kings and queens
 Hidden treasures found underground, all silver and gold mines and other metals
 They were given a third of any revenues received by the king of Connacht of any other provinces where wrong had been done
 The revenue (or ) of killing a person was considered very large and in one document recorded was states as being "168 cows"

Along with the privileges that kings and queens of Uí Maine received, the clans that fought for Uí Maine were also given privileges and rights:
 Any member of a clan was given a choice to go to battle in spring or autumn.  Most members that chose not to attend battle spent time maintaining their crops.
 It was required that "no man of the province is to be taken as a witness against these tribes, but another Hy Manian is to bear witness".
 If the king of Connacht did not pull out or end a battle in six weeks or less when fighting in Ulster or Leinster, any member was allowed to return home.
 "However great may be the accusation brought against them by dishonest people, only one man or one witness is required to dent it or prove it against the other party."
 Uí Mhaine were to be baptised by the Comharba of St. Bridget.  If parents chose not to baptise their children at St. Bridget's because they lived too far away they were required to pay the Comharba a penny.
This fee was said to be 3 Irish pennies.

Members of Uí Maine Families

 Thomas MacNevin
 Albéric O'Kelly de Galway
 William O'Kelly Nevin (Irish Republican and personal physician to Empress Maria Theresa of the Holy Roman Empire)
 Edward Kelley, also known as Edward Talbot (11 August 1555 – 1 November 1597), Tudor occultist and self-declared spirit medium who worked with John Dee.
 Gerald Lally-Tollendahl (Marquis de Lally-Tollendal, prime minister of Scotland under James I; Lord of Tollendahl)

See also

 Kings of Uí Maine
 Leabhar Ua Maine
 Edward Kelley
 The Uí Maine were traditionally thought to be descended from Colla da Crioch, one of the Three Collas. Their original homeland was Oirghialla. DNA testing of descendants of Uilliam Buidhe Ó Cellaigh, however, speculates that the Uí Maine were not descended from the Three Collas.

References

External links
 http://www.rootsweb.ancestry.com/~irlkik/ihm/uimaine.htm
 Annals of Ulster at CELT: Corpus of Electronic Texts at University College Cork
 Annals of Tigernach at CELT: Corpus of Electronic Texts at University College Cork
 Revised edition of McCarthy's synchronisms at Trinity College Dublin.
 Irish Kings and High-Kings, Francis John Byrne, Dublin (1971;2003) Four Courts Press, 
 History of the O'Maddens of Hy-Many, Gerard Madden, 2004. .
 The Life, Legends and Legacy of Saint Kerrill: A Fifth-Century East Galway Evangelist by Joseph Mannion, 2004. 
 http://www.ucc.ie/celt/published/G105007/index.html

Connachta
States and territories established in the 4th century
Kingdoms of medieval Ireland
History of County Galway
Geography of County Galway
Gaels
Former kingdoms in Ireland